Greg Hanna (born in Finch, Ontario, Canada) is a male Canadian country music singer. Signing with his own independent label in 1995, Hanna charted several singles on the RPM Country Tracks chart in Canada, including the top ten hit "Ain't No Justice" from 1997, but his debut album was never issued. In 2005, Hanna appeared on the third season of Nashville Star, but dropped out after receiving an offer to work with producer Chris Farren. In 2007, Hanna toured Canada as the opening act for Canadian country band Emerson Drive's Countrified Tour. Hanna's debut self-titled album was issued in October 2009 in the United States and Canada on his own US record label imprint, Pheromone Records LLC; with MegaForce Records and Sony. From his debut CD in the US and Canada came the releases "It's a Man's Job," "What Kind of Love Are You On" and "Makin' Love Real." Their supporting music videos which earned Hanna exposure on television networks such as CMT, GAC and TCN. In 2010, Hanna signed with the Paradigm agency for representation and booked his first major USA tour as opening act on the American Ride Tour for Toby Keith and Trace Adkins.

Discography

Greg Hanna (2009)

"Bump in the Road" (David Lee Murphy, Kim Tribble) – 3:34
"It's a Man's Job" (Ashley Gorley, Wade Kirby, Tribble) – 3:23
"Live for Today" (Greg Hanna, Tribble) – 3:51
"Makin' Love Real" (Hanna, James Dean Hicks, Tribble) – 4:13
"Hillbilly Heartattack" (Hanna, Shane Minor) – 3:20
"She Means Everything to Me" (Murphy, Tribble) – 3:48
"What Kind of Love Are You On" (Hanna, Murphy, Tribble) – 3:42
"In Between Dreams" (Hanna, Brad Mates, Minor) – 3:51
"Only One Lover" (Keith Follesé, Tribble) – 3:53
"Singin' to the Radio" (Hanna, Kirby, Tribble) – 4:00
"Song in My Head" (Chris Farren, Gorley, Hanna) – 3:16

Singles
1995–1997

2005–present

Music videos

References

External links
Greg Hanna Official website

Canadian country singer-songwriters
Canadian male singer-songwriters
People from the United Counties of Stormont, Dundas and Glengarry
Living people
Musicians from Ontario
Year of birth missing (living people)